Michael Abbott Holland (born March 5, 1969), is an American songwriter, musician, and producer that got his start with the alternative rock band Jennanykind in the 1990s and early 2000s. His music and other recordings, with Jennyanykind, The Holland Bros. and solo, have appeared in films such as Desert Saints, The World Made Straight, and the Jody Hill film The Legacy of a Whitetail Deer Hunter, and series such as Apple TV+'s Dickinson, F/X's Baskets, and HBO's The Righteous Gemstones. Holland also appeared with his twin brother Mark in The Righteous Gemstones Season 1 Episode 3 as musicians at a church picnic playing their production of the old hymnal The Old Country Church. Holland's music has been covered by artists such as Dean Wareham and Dean & Britta.

Biography
Holland is originally from the Charlotte area in North Carolina, US. He is a son of John and Betty Jo Holland. He grew up in Monroe, North Carolina and spent his teenage years in Anderson, South Carolina after the family moved there in 1982. After graduating from Clemson University in 1991, he moved to Chapel Hill, North Carolina to focus on music. He has an older brother, John Jr. and an identical twin, Mark who also moved to Chapel Hill in 1992 and joined Michael to pursue a career as musicians. Holland is married to Juliet (Dickey) Holland, a concert and event planning executive for Pandora Media. Holland has a son, Jack from a previous marriage.

Career

Jennanykind (1991 - 2012) 
Michael Holland is a founding member of the rock band Jennyanykind that was primarily active in the 1990s alternative music scene. Jennyanykind was discovered by legendary A&R executive Terry Tolkin and signed to his own No. 6 Records. Jennyanykind released three recordings on No. 6 Records between 1993 - 1995:
 Etc... (1994)
 Blues of the Afflicted (EP)(1995)
 Mythic (1995)

In late 1995, Tolkin signed the band to Elektra Records. Revelater, recorded with producer Dave Fridman was the band's only Elektra release.

In 1998, Jennyanykind signed with Yep Roc Records and released the self-produced Big Johns the same year. After a second release on Yep Roc, I Need You, recorded and released the following year, the band retired.

Jennyanykind reunited in 2003 and recorded Peas and Collards for MoRisen Records, and again in 2011 for a split single with The Moaners on the label Holidays for Quince. The song from that single, "Jam Up and Jelly Tight", also appeared in the film The World Made Straight.

Solo (2003 - present) 
As a solo artist, Holland has been active off and on since his initial album Bootlegger's Dreams, recorded in 1999 after Jennyanykind retired was released in 2003 on his own Big John's label. In 2002, he was a SXSW critics pick for his show at the original Antone's. During this time, Holland occasionally played with local bluegrass group Big Fat Gap Band, and eventually asked them to back him up on the recording sessions that would become what has been called a visionary album, Tomorrows American Treasures, released on Sit-n-Spin Records in 2005. Holland was also featured as an up-and-coming artist in American Way Magazine in 2006.

Tomorrows American Treasures caught the ear of German label Moll Tonträger owner Jan Szlovak, which resulted in a collection of songs that nodded towards traditional country music, Simple Truths and Pleasures in 2008. Holland continued exploring more American themes in the Szlovak-funded album Rhythm of Love, recorded with a cast of musicians named The Occoneechee String Band for the project.

In 2020, Holland released two Christmas-themed songs, "Those Christmas Lights", and "The Fatman Rocks", originally written for the film Fatman, with proceeds from sales being donated to St. Jude's Children's Research Hospital.

The Holland Bros (2013 - present) 
Since 2013, Michael Holland has recorded and performed with twin brother and former Jennyanykind bandmate Mark Holland as The Holland Bros., a musical duo that focuses on a pre-war music mix of covers and originals that cover country and piedmont blues, jugband, folk, and country. In 2019, the Holland Bros. appeared in the HBO series The Righteous Gemstones (as uncredited bluegrass musicians in Season 1, Episode 3), and performed at the North Carolina State Fair.

In 2021, the brothers arranged and recorded a version of The Mermaid with Beth Ditto singing lead vocal for the AppleTV+ series Dickinson. The brothers appear uncredited with fiddle player Bobby Britt and bassist Billie Feather in Season 3 Episode 4 as the backing band for Ditto as she performs a portion of the recorded song during one of the episode's scenes. Later in the same episode, the band is heard and seen playing a version of Old Joe Clark produced by Michael and released under the name Occoneechee String Band.

The duo have released three recordings:
 Dueling Devils (2013)
 Yo! To The Holland Brothers (2015)
 The Mermaid (2021)

Production and other projects (1998 - present) 
From 2010 to 2011, Holland played bass for the indie pop band Fan Modine, which at the time was managed by former R.E.M. Manager Jefferson Holt. Holland's bass playing appears on one Fan Modine track, the Alex Chilton song, "The EMI Song (Smile For Me)".

Discography

References

Further reading 
 North Carolina Musicians: Photographs and Conversations
 Friday Night Music - Bynum General Store and The Carolina Inn
 Interview with Terry Tolkin
 The Contemporary Soundtrack in Dickinson

Living people
1969 births
Musicians from Charlotte, North Carolina
21st-century American male musicians
Bluegrass musicians
American bluegrass musicians
American pop musicians
Americana musicians
American blues singer-songwriters
American male singer-songwriters